Omoglymmius tolai is a species of beetle in the subfamily Rhysodidae. It was described by R.T. Bell and J.R. Bell in 1985. It is known from New Britain (Bismarck Archipelago, Papua New Guinea).

Omoglymmius tolai measure  in length.

References

tolai
Beetles of Papua New Guinea
Endemic fauna of Papua New Guinea
Fauna of New Britain
Beetles described in 1985